Phalonidia plicana is a species of moth of the family Tortricidae. It is found in North America in Sonora and California.

Adults have been recorded on wing in April and August.

References

Phalonidia
Moths of Central America
Moths of North America
Moths described in 1884